Arena Sport is a regional pay television sports network. It consists of ten television channels and is coverage area includes Bosnia and Herzegovina, Croatia, Kosovo, Montenegro, North Macedonia, Serbia and Slovenia.

Localised feeds

Serbia
Arena Sport Serbia carries several sports events. Most of them are centred towards football, mainly matches from English Premier League, Spanish La Liga, Italian Serie A, French Ligue 1, Portuguese Primeira League, as well as international competitions such as the UEFA Champions League, Europa League, UEFA Nations League and the UEFA Conference League. Arena Sport Serbia has the broadcasting rights of the Serbian SuperLiga.

In addition to football, the Arena Sports transfers and other sporting events such as NBA, Liga ACB, VTB United League, ABA League and NCAA leagues, handball EHF Champions League, Handball-Bundesliga, France LNH Division 1, volleyball CEV Champions League, NFL and the MLB.

Croatia
Arenasport has additionally acquired broadcasting rights for La Liga for a period of five years between June 2021 and 2026. In addition, reports and other football leagues as well as in Serbia.

Arena Sport attained the rights to broadcast the NBA in September 2019, and additionally broadcast the ABA League and the domestic HT Premijer liga.

In terms of handball, Arenasport holds the broadcasting rights to the EHF Champions League, Handball-Bundesliga, SEHA League and the LNH Division 1.

Bosnia and Herzegovina
Arena Sport Bosnia and Herzegovina airs Bosnian Premier League, First League of FBiH, and Bosnian Cup matches.

Sport events

Football

Europe

International competitions
  UEFA Champions League (except Slovenia)
  UEFA Europa League (2021-)
  UEFA Europa Conference League (2021-)
  UEFA Super Cup (except Slovenia, 2021-)
  UEFA Youth League (except Slovenia)
  UEFA Euro 2024 qualifying (except Croatia and Slovenia)
  UEFA Euro 2028 qualifying (except Croatia and Slovenia)
  FIFA World Cup 2026 qualification (UEFA) (except Croatia and Slovenia)
  UEFA Nations League (except Croatia and Slovenia)

League

Cup
  League Cup
  Copa del Rey
  Coppa Italia (2021-)
  German Cup 
  Taça da Liga
  Belgian Cup
  Swiss Cup
  Serbian Cup
  Bosnian Cup (only in BiH)
  Montenegrin Cup (only final)
  Greek Cup
  Macedonian Cup (only final)
  Italian Super Cup (2021-)
  French Super Cup (2021-)
  Russian Super Cup (2022-)
  Belgian Super Cup
  Croatian Super Cup (2022-)

America
  Copa América
  Copa Libertadores
  Copa Sudamericana
  Recopa Sudamericana
  Liga MX
  Campeonato Brasileiro Série A
  Copa do Brasil
  Primera División
  Copa de la Superliga
   MLS

Asia & Oceania
  A-League
  Chinese Super League
  Indian Super League (2022-)
  K League

Basketball

Handball

Volleyball

American football

Baseball

Ice hockey

Rugby

Motorsports

References

External links

Television channels and stations established in 2010
Television channels and stations established in 2020
Television networks in Bosnia and Herzegovina
Television channels in North Macedonia
Television networks in Croatia
Sports television networks
Sports television in Bosnia and Herzegovina
Sports television in Croatia
Sports television in Serbia
Sports television in Slovenia
Sports television in North Macedonia